USS Legonia II (SP-399) was a United States Navy patrol vessel in commission from 1917 to 1921.
 
Legonia II was built as the private steam yacht Walucia in 1909 by Pusey & Jones at Wilmington, Delaware. She later was renamed Lydonia, then Legonia II.

On 6 June 1917, the U.S. Navy purchased her from William B. Hurst of Baltimore, Maryland, for use as a section patrol vessel during World War I. The Navy took delivery of her from Hurst on 9 June 1917, and she was enrolled in the Naval Coast Defense Reserve on 12 June 1917. She was commissioned at Baltimore as USS Legonia II (SP-399) on 14 June 1917.

Assigned to the 5th Naval District, Legonia II was based at Norfolk, Virginia, for the rest of World War I. She served as a messenger and dispatch vessel and as flagship of the Commandant, 5th Naval District, and as flagship made visits to Norfolk; Washington, D.C.; Annapolis, Maryland; and Baltimore. In addition, she served as a harbor and coastal guard ship off Cape Henry, Virginia, patrolled submarine nets, and escorted arriving and departing merchant ships through the defensive sea area of Hampton Roads. After the war ended on 11 November 1918, she remained in service as flagship of the naval district.

Legonia II was decommissioned on 1 August 1921. She was sold to Dr. John M. Masury of Norfolk on 30 September 1921.

References

Department of the Navy Naval History and Heritage Command Online Library of Selected Images: Civilian Ships: Legonia II (American Steam Yacht, 1909). Also named Walucia and Lydonia. Served as USS Legonia II (SP-399) in 1917-1921
NavSource Online: Section Patrol Craft Photo Archive: Legonia II (SP 399)

Patrol vessels of the United States Navy
World War I patrol vessels of the United States
Ships built by Pusey and Jones
1909 ships
Individual yachts